Gordonia cholesterolivorans is a bacterium from the genus Gordonia which has been isolated from sewage sludge from a sewage treatment plant in Ciudad Real in Spain. Gordonia cholesterolivorans has the ability to degrade cholesterol.

References

External links
Type strain of Gordonia cholesterolivorans at BacDive -  the Bacterial Diversity Metadatabase	

Mycobacteriales
Bacteria described in 2009